The MV Discovery (formerly Island Venture, Island Princess, Hyundai Pungak and Platinum) was a cruise ship, which was formerly operated by Voyages of Discovery and was last in service for Cruise & Maritime Voyages. She was scrapped in Alang, India as Amen in 2014.

History

The ship began operation in 1972 with Flagship Cruises, under the name Island Venture. In 1974, she was sold to P&O's Princess Cruises along with sister ship Sea Venture. The pair were renamed Island Princess and Pacific Princess, the latter, laid up since 2008 at the San Giorgio del Porto shipyard in Genoa, Italy, and as of early 2013 apparently destined for scrapping at Aliaga, Turkey. Both appeared in the 1970s television sitcom The Love Boat, although the Pacific Princess was the main feature of the show. The Island Princess operated as part of the Princess fleet until 1999, when she was sold on to Hyundai Merchant Marine of South Korea. Renamed Hyundai Pungak her role was to transport South Korean pilgrims to religious sites in North Korea.

After a brief stint as the Platinum, the ship went through a major refit between 2001 and 2003, after which the vessel sailed as Discovery under the care of the cruise company Voyages of Discovery (part of the All Leisure Group Plc), cruising out of Harwich and Liverpool in England. Voyages of Discovery sold these cruises predominately to the British, American, Canadian, Australian, New Zealand and South African markets.

For the most part Discovery could be found in the Baltic, Scandinavia, the Mediterranean and Aegean Sea, and North Africa from April through September (Spring and Summer in the Northern Hemisphere), and in South America, Antarctica, the Indian Ocean, India, and the Mediterranean from October through March (Spring and Summer in the Southern Hemisphere).

In February 2013, for 249 days, the Discovery sailed for Cruise & Maritime Voyages following a joint agreement with All Leisure Group, in which both companies would operate the ship.

From 2012 through 2013 the owners of Discovery replaced her under their Voyages of Discovery brand with the refurbished ship MV Voyager.

March 2013 Maritime and Coastguard Agency detention

In early March 2013, on her maiden voyage with Cruise & Maritime Voyages, the Discovery was detained in Portland Harbour by the Maritime and Coastguard Agency after a recent routine inspection revealed that the ship's safety drills and crew's familiarisation of the vessel were inadequate. The cruise was cancelled after passengers spent around 24 hours aboard the ship, before leaving the vessel and boarding coaches out of the port. Afterwards, passengers expressed their anger about the cruise being cancelled but also about dirty wash areas and exposed electrics aboard the ship. Passengers were offered a full refund as well as £250 compensation and 40 percent off their next cruise with the company.

Cruise and Maritime voyages issued a statement in response to the incident.

"Due to unusual and unforeseeable circumstances beyond our control and notwithstanding the recent dry-docking, the vessel has encountered technical problems which prevent her from sailing. We have been unable to resolve these technical issues to enable us to continue with the cruise on time and further works will have to be undertaken to ensure all issues are fully resolved.".

The ship was due to set sail from Avonmouth after arriving from Italy after refit but due to weather conditions it was diverted to Portland, with the passengers being brought to the port from Avonmouth by coach.

On 11 March 2013, Cruise and Maritime Voyages announced that the Maritime and Coastguard agency had cleared the ship for active service. The ship left on her second cruise with Cruise and Maritime Voyages on 15 March, from Avonmouth, the first cruise ship to do this in around 20 years.

Retirement 
All Leisure Group took Discovery out of service in late 2014 due to operating losses. In mid-September, Discovery was sold by All Leisure Group "as is" for $5 million and her service with Cruise Maritime Voyages terminated two cruises early. For October she was replaced by Portuscale Cruises' MV Funchal and in 2015 was replaced by MV Azores. Discovery departed Bristol, Avonmouth for the final time on October 9, 2014, bound to anchor off Falmouth for a few hours the day after. Following her brief anchorage off Falmouth, she sailed south to the Strait of Gibraltar. Upon entering the Mediterranean, she was reported to have been renamed AMEN and flagged in St. Kitts and Nevis. She sailed directly towards Port Said and days later transited the Suez Canal. Discovery was broken up in Alang in 2014. Her sister ship, Pacific, was broken up two years prior at Aliağa.

General characteristics

Propulsion was by four Fiat medium-speed diesel engines with a combined power output of 18,000 shaft horsepower. The engines were individually clutched and geared in pairs to each of the two shafts which drive controllable-pitch propellers. This arrangement enabled one or more engines to be shut down and de-clutched as required. Last registry was under the Saint Kitts and Nevis flag.

On board eight decks were open to the public: Sky Deck, Sun Deck, Bridge Deck, Promenade Deck, Riviera Deck, Pacific Deck, Bali Deck and Coral Deck.

References

External links

 M/S Island Venture

Expedition cruising
Ships built in Emden
Ships of Princess Cruises
Cruise ships of Norway
Passenger ships of Panama
Passenger ships of Bermuda
Hyundai Group
1971 ships